Unbelievable is the fifth studio album by American country music group Diamond Rio. Its title track and "You're Gone" were both Top 5 hits on the country charts in 1998-1999, while "I Know How the River Feels" (originally cut by Ty Herndon on his Living in a Moment album) was a minor Top 40, and was later a #69 for the group McAlyster in 2000.

Critical reception
Entertainment Weekly thought that the band "knows how to please with show-off musicianship and clever vocal harmonies ... but too often they call more attention to how hard they’re working than to what lies between the grooves."

Track listing

Personnel

Diamond Rio 
 Marty Roe – lead vocals
 Dan Truman – keyboards, string arrangements
 Jimmy Olander – acoustic guitar, electric guitars
 Gene Johnson – mandolin, backing vocals
 Dana Williams – bass, backing vocals 
 Brian Prout – drums

Additional Musicians 
 Michael Wyatt – percussion
 Carl Marsh- string arrangements and conductor
 John Catchings – cello
 Kathryn Plummer – viola
 Kristin Wilkinson – viola
 David Davidson – violin

Production 
 Diamond Rio – producers
 Mike Clute – producer, engineer, mixing 
 Pete Miskinis – assistant engineer
 Matt Svobodny – assistant engineer
 Glenn Meadows – mastering 
 Jennifer Rose – project coordinator 
 Maude Gilman-Clapham – art direction 
 S. Wade Hunt – design 
 Fred C. Moran – cover artwork 
 Jim "Señor" McGuire – photography 
 Lori Turk – grooming 
 Claudia Robertson-Fowler – stylist

Studios
 Recorded at Midtown Tone & Volume and OmniSound (Nashville, Tennessee).
 Mixed and Mastered at Masterfonics (Nashville, Tennessee).

Charts

Weekly charts

Year-end charts

Certifications

References

1998 albums
Arista Records albums
Diamond Rio albums